The Ebenezer Heath House is a historic house at 30 Heath Street in Brookline, Massachusetts.  The two-story wood-frame house was built in 1794 by John Heath for his son Ebenezer and daughter-in-law Hannah (Williams) Heath.  The Heaths were related to the Sewall family, who were major local landowners in the 18th century.  The house is five bays wide, with a hip roof pierced by a pair of chimneys behind the center roofline.  The main entrance is flanked by pilasters, and topped by a four-light transom window and dentillated triangular pediment.

The house was listed on the National Register of Historic Places in 1985.

See also
National Register of Historic Places listings in Brookline, Massachusetts

References

Houses completed in 1791
Georgian architecture in Massachusetts
Federal architecture in Massachusetts
Houses in Brookline, Massachusetts
National Register of Historic Places in Brookline, Massachusetts
Houses on the National Register of Historic Places in Norfolk County, Massachusetts